The 2012 Indian Telly Awards, officially the 11th Indian Telly Awards ceremony, presented by the Indiantelevision.com honouring Indian television shows of 2011 took place on 31 May 2012 in Mumbai. The ceremony was televised in India and internationally on Colors TV. Actors Ram Kapoor and Ronit Roy hosted the ceremony for the first time. The ceremony was co-hosted by Manish Paul & Roshni Chopra. The Telly Award Blue Carpet was hosted by Mona Singh & Manish Paul

List of winners

See also 
 Indian Telly Awards

References

External links 
 Winners of 11th Indian Telly Awards

Indian Telly Awards
2012 in Indian television